Plainview is an unincorporated community in Deschutes County, Oregon, United States. Plainview is located off of U.S. Route 20 several miles southeast of Sisters, Oregon.

References

Unincorporated communities in Deschutes County, Oregon